Pepe Reilly (born August 19, 1971) is an American boxer. He competed in the men's welterweight event at the 1992 Summer Olympics.

References

External links
 

1971 births
Living people
American male boxers
Olympic boxers of the United States
Boxers at the 1992 Summer Olympics
Boxers from Los Angeles
Welterweight boxers